The Ministry of Trade, Industry and Energy (MOTIE) is a ministry under the Government of South Korea.  It is concerned with regulating some economic policy, especially with regard to the industrial and energy sectors.  The ministry also works to encourage foreign investment in Korea. The current minister is Lee Chang-yang.

The ministry began in 1948 as the Ministry of Commerce in the First Republic. In 1993 it was merged with the Ministry of Energy, established in 1977. A year later the ministry changed its name to Ministry of Trade and Energy. In 1998 it transferred trade negotiation duties to the foreign ministry changing its name to Ministry of Industry and Energy. In 2008 it was restructured into Ministry of Knowledge Economy following newly elected president Lee Myung-bak's cabinet reorganisation. In 2013 following President Park Geun-hye's cabinet reorganisation the ministry was restructured into the current form bringing back trade negotiation duties from the foreign ministry. In 2017 it delegated duties related to SMEs to newly created Ministry of SMEs and Startups under President Moon Jae-in. In 2018 it added the third vice ministerial role for energy policies in addition to existing trade minister and vice minister (now 1st vice minister).

Headquarters
The headquarters are located in the Sejong Regional Government Complex in Sejong City. The headquarters were formerly located in the Gwacheon Government Complex in Gwacheon, Gyeonggi Province.

Subsidiary sections
Subsidiary organisations of the MOTIE include:
Korean Agency for Technology and Standards
Korea Trade Commission (not to be confused with the country's anti-trust agency Fair Trade Commission)
Mine Registration Office
Electricity Regulatory Committee
Free Economic Zone Planning Office

Organization

Minister
 Policy Advisor to the Minister
 Director General for Audit and Inspection

Spokesperson

Minister for Trade
 Deputy Minister for Trade

Bureau of Trade Policy

Bureau of Trade Cooperation

Office of FTA Negotiations
 Director General for FTA Policy
 Director General for FTA Negotiations
 East Asia FTA Bureau

Office of International Trade and Legal Affairs
 Director General for International Trade Affairs
 Director General for Trade Legal Affairs and Public Relations

Office of International Trade and Investment
 Director General for International Trade Policy
 Director General for Cross-Border Investment Policy
 Director General for Domestic Policy on Trade
 Director General for Trade Controls Policy

1st Vice Minister

Office of Planning and Coordination
 Director General for Policy Coordination
 Director General for Emergency and Security Planning

Office of Industrial Policy
 Director General for Industrial Policy
 Director General for Materials and Components Industries
 Director General for Manufacturing Industry

Office of Industry and Enterprise Innovation 
 Director General for Industrial Technology Convergence Policy
 Director General for Regional Economic Policy
 Director General for Middle Market Enterprise Policy

2nd Vice Minister

Office of Energy Industry
 Director General for Energy Transition Policy Policy 
 Director General for Electricity Innovation Policy 
 Director General for Renewable Energy Policy 
 Director General for Hydrogen Economy Policy

Bureau of Resource Industry Policy

Bureau of Nuclear Energy Industry Policy

See also

Government of South Korea
List of government agencies of South Korea
Economy of South Korea

References

External links
Official MOTIE page
Official MOTIE page /MUL
Ministry of Knowledge Economy (Archive)
Ministry of Knowledge Economy  (Archive)
Official MOCIE Page (Archive)
Official MOCIE Page  (Archive)

Government ministries of South Korea
Economy of South Korea
South Korea
South Korea
South Korea
Ministries established in 1948
1948 establishments in South Korea